The 2006 season in Swedish football, starting January 2006 and ending December 2006:

Events 
 18 January 2006: The Swedish national team plays a friendly in Riyadh, Saudi Arabia against the hosts, causing upset home in Sweden when it is revealed that no women are allowed at the stadium.
 2 September 2006: The punishment for the clubs involved in the tumult at Söderstadion during the 53 minute abandoned match Hammarby IF–Djurgårdens IF played 28 September—when home fans stormed the pitch and shot fireworks from the stands—is decided by the Swedish Football Association; Hammarby IF loses the match 0–3 (the score when the match was abandoned), loses an extra three points, and are fined 200,000 SEK, Djurgårdens IF are fined 15,000 SEK.
 5 November 2006: IF Elfsborg beat Djurgårdens IF 1–0 in the last matchday of 2006 Allsvenskan and become champions for the first time since 1961.
 9 December 2006: The Swedish Football Association decides to increase the number of teams in Allsvenskan from 14 to 16—effective from the 2008 season—meaning that the 2007 season will see only one team being relegated from Allsvenskan while three teams will be automatically promoted from Superettan.

Honours

Official titles

Competitions

Promotions, relegations and qualifications

Promotions

League transfers

Relegations

International qualifications

Domestic results

Allsvenskan

2006 Allsvenskan qualification play-off

Superettan

2006 Superettan qualification play-off

2006 Division 1 Norra

2006 Division 1 Södra

2006 Svenska Cupen 
Quarter-finals

Semi-finals

Final

National team results

Notes

References 
Print

Online

 
Seasons in Swedish football